Roman Alexandrovich Mylnikov (born 11 October 1986) is a Russian former ice dancer. With Ksenia Antonova, he won two bronze medals on the ISU Junior Grand Prix series. Earlier, he competed with Antonina Sadokhina.

Competitive highlights

With Antonova

With Sadokhina

References

External links

 
 Ksenia Antonova / Roman Mylnikov at Tracings.net

Russian male ice dancers
Living people
1986 births